Surfers Paradise International Raceway was a motor racing complex at Gold Coast, Queensland, Australia. It was located opposite the Surfers Paradise Ski Gardens at Carrara.

The circuit
Surfers Paradise Raceway included a dragstrip along the main straight (a design later incorporated into the Williams owned Adelaide International Raceway), with a very fast right-hander under the Dunlop Bridge leading to a tight corner that turned the track back to a medium-length straight. Then a fast left hander before rushing into a series of rights and lefts that skirted the only hill on the property (commonly known as Repco Hill). A slow right called that opened up brought the track back to the main straight.

The right hand turn under the Dunlop Bridge was widely considered the fastest and most daunting corner in Australian motorsport until the building of the Chase chicane at the Mount Panorama Circuit in 1987, with many top drivers including Allan Moffat, John Harvey and Tony Edmonson all having crashed there over the years.

Within the circuit lay an airstrip and quarter-mile speedway similar to the one that used to sit within the lower part of the Amaroo Park circuit in Sydney. Drag racing commenced at Easter in 1966, with the June meet, the Winternationals, beginning in 1968.  The Winternationals became the largest drag racing meet outside the United States.

Keith Williams sold the raceway in 1984, and the circuit closed at the end of 1987 after 21 years of operation, with the final meeting held on the 27th of August. At the end of its life, the outright lap record of 1:04.3 was set in 1986 and was held by John Bowe driving the Chevrolet powered Veskanda C1 Group A/Group C sports car. The Winternationals moved to Willowbank Raceway in 1988, where the race continues to this day. After years of neglect, it was finally destroyed in 2003. The site has since been redeveloped as Emerald Lakes canal estate.

Major races

Tasman Series
With Lakeside well established as a Queensland's round of the Tasman Series it was not until 1968 that the series visited Surfers Paradise. As typified the 1968 series Jim Clark (Lotus Ford) and Chris Amon (Ferrari) filled the top two positions with Clark's teammate Graham Hill completing the podium. Formula 5000 Tasman Series rounds were also held at the circuit each year from 1970 to 1975.

Australian Grand Prix
The Australian Grand Prix visited just once, in 1975. In torrential rain Max Stewart took his Lola T400 Formula 5000 to victory from John Leffler, who was second on a day when the F5000's were badly out-handled by Ray Winter driving his AF2 Mildren Mono Ford.

Rothmans International Series
With the demise of the Tasman Series after 1976, the void was filled with the Rothmans International Series from 1976 to 1979. The first race scheduled for Surfers Paradise on 29 February 1976 was cancelled.

Australian Touring Car Championship
The circuit hosted rounds of the Australian Touring Car Championship in 1969, 1971–72, 1974–77 and from 1979 until the circuits closure in 1987.

* The 1976 and 1977 ATCC rounds at Surfers were the Rothmans 300 endurance races

Endurance races
Numerous endurance races were staged at the circuit, most notably the Rothmans 12 Hour events.

National championship rounds
Rounds of various Australian motor racing championship were held at the circuit. Winners of the Surfers Paradise round of a selection of these championships is shown below.

Australian Drivers' Championship

Australian Sports Car Championship

Australian Sports Sedan Championship

Australian GT Championship

See also

 Sports on the Gold Coast, Queensland
 Surfers Paradise Street Circuit

References

Former Supercars Championship circuits
Motorsport at Surfers Paradise International Raceway
Sports venues on the Gold Coast, Queensland
Defunct motorsport venues in Australia
Australian Grand Prix
Carrara, Queensland
Motorsport venues in Queensland